The Flagpole of Freedom Park is a proposed multi-use complex to be built near Columbia Falls, Maine for the United States Semiquincentennial.

Project 
The developer is Worcester Resources, founded and directed by the Worcester family who own Worcester Wreath Co. in Columbia Falls and who manage Wreaths Across America. The Worcesters envision a park honoring approximately 24 million veterans, each of whom would have his or her name inscribed on one of 55 memorial walls, making it "the only place in the country to honor all ... veterans in one location" and "the equivalent of 411 Vietnam Wall Memorials." The project is expected to take 10 years to build, with the initial phase projected for completion on July 4, 2026, with the unveiling of a 1,461-foot flagpole designed by LeMessurier Consultants and built with an inside elevator and two observation decks. The Flagpole of Freedom would be the tallest flagpole in the world and surpass, by seven feet, the height of the Empire State Building. It would fly "the largest American flag in the world at over 74,048 square feet — the equivalent area of almost 1 1/2 football fields." The flagpole will stand on a 315-foot hill, with a total aggregate height of 1,776 above sea level. The Observation Ball deck will offer "360 degree views in a 100-mile radius." 

Park plans include a 4,000-seat amphitheater and concert space; trails for hiking, Nordic skiing and snowshoeing;restaurants, shops, and a hotel in a sector called The Village of Old Glory; six Halls of History museums with "immersive tech-driven exhibits." The Worcesters said that 90% of the park will be free to the public, with the remaining 10% comprising ticketed events at the theatre and the museums.

The Worcesters publicly announced details of the project at a press conference held at the Augusta Civic Center on Tuesday, March 29, 2022. Two days later, Triple Impact Connections, which labels itself as "a first-of-its-kind veteran-owned customer contact center staffed by military spouses," issued a press release stating that it had partnered with the Flagpole of Freedom team. 

The idea for a park had been under development for thirteen years. The proposed development site is located in the same balsam forest where Worcester Wreaths harvests garlands for Wreaths Across America, which is about an hour-and-a-half from Bangor and from the Canadian border. 

The Worcesters originally prognosticated a workforce of 8,000, but they've since increased that estimate to 3,000 people involved in construction and approximately 12,000 full-time employees when completed. To house the construction workers, the Worcesters propose building living quarters which would be turned into vacation rentals when the project is culminated. 
When asked about the impact of bringing 12,000 employees into Washington County, which had a population of 31,121 as of the 2020 census, county commissioner Chris Gardner commented, "We're going to file that under good problems. The fact of the matter is we look at our population of Washington County as what it is, and we somehow think that’s what it always was. I do a lot of work in Eastport, Maine. The population of Eastport today is 1,300 people. At the turn of the century — 1900 — there were 5,000 people in Eastport, Maine. So this idea that somehow bringing more people to Washington County is going to somehow change who we are, the reality is it might allow us to get back better to who we once were.""we’re going to file that under good problems," comparing it to the 5,000 individuals who lived in Eastport, Maine in 1900. Gardner has further commented that "it will truly fit into the fabric of our community." Likewise, state senator Marianne Moore (R-Calais) sees it as an initiative that "will create abundant opportunities for our area to thrive."

The $1 billion project is being registered as a for-profit limited liability company (LLC) and will be initially funded through private donations ranging from $660 to $1,800, with donors, or Park Founders, given lifetime admission to the site and their name inscribed at Founders Place. “The great thing about this is it’s not funded by the government. It’s going to be privately funded. And we can’t really give it the title of a national park, but it will have almost more meaning than a national park,” Mike Worcester said. The Flagpole of Freedom website states that the developer "will not begin construction until we have raised 25% of the capital needed to build the Park. If we don’t meet that threshold in the sole and absolute discretion of Flagpole of Freedom Park management by 3/30/2023 ('Threshold Date'), all Park Foundership purchases will be cancelled unconditionally, and all foundership fees, less any credit card processing fees incurred for the purchase and refund transaction(s), will be refunded."

Proposed Land Annexation 
The project site is on land within Centerville Township and T19 MD BPP, which are under the jurisdiction of the Maine Land Use Planning Commission (LUPC), the authority that oversees planning and zoning in the state's unorganized territories. In April 2022, the 130th Maine Legislature passed an act to allow the two lots, which together total 10,416 acres, to be annexed by the town of Columbia Falls, which would place jurisdiction for land use under the Columbia Falls Planning Board. The annexation is subject to approval by the legal voters of Columbia Falls at a town referendum. The annexation bill was sponsored by Senator Moore at the request of the Worcesters. Its language exempts the property from a Maine state statute that requires a municipality to adopt planning and zoning rules for annexed lands that are at least as protective as those applied by LUPC.  As of January 2023, the town had yet to schedule a vote on annexation. 

On October 10, 2022, the Columbia Falls Select Board proposed an agreement between the town and Worcester Resources that would require the company to deposit $150,000 with the town to pay for legal and planning costs associated with the Flagpole project. “The Project is expected to have a significant impact on, among other things, the existing land uses, natural, cultural and archaeological resources, scenic values, recreational resources, economy, public infrastructure, and rural character of Columbia Falls, Washington County, and the Downeast Region of Maine,” the agreement states. The Select Board also resolved to “ensure that the voters of the Town have the opportunity to become fully and fairly informed of the scope and scale of potential impacts of the Annexation Proposal and the Project.” It said, “the Developer has failed to respond to the Town’s requests to provide additional information regarding the Project, (and) has declined to enter into an agreement to pay the Town for fees and costs associated with the Town’s evaluation and consideration of the Annexation Proposal.” In a statement released October 14, 2022, Rob Worcester objected to the proposed $150,000 deposit, but said “we would very much like to find an agreeable figure that meets both the municipality’s needs, and ours.”

Development Moratorium 
At a December 2022 meeting, the Columbia Falls Select Board began preparing for a measure that would ask voters to place a moratorium on large-scale commercial and high-density developments to allow officials time to develop zoning, traffic and other regulations. The town's lawyer, Aga Dixon, said the moratorium was not specific to the Flagpole of Freedom. “No matter what kind of proposal comes before this community of any large scale, there are significant risks to this community in terms of overwhelming your public infrastructure, your public services, and changing the character of this community,” Dixon said. The Select Board said the moratorium question may be put to voters at the annual town meeting in March. A January 2023 survey of town residents explains that a moratorium will put a "6-month pause" on "large-scale commercial development--commercial, industrial, or non-residential development that is more than 100 feet in height or disturbs 3 or more acres of land" and "high-density residential development—residential development containing 15 or more dwelling units that disturbs 3 or more acres of land." Tim Pease, a lawyer for Worcester Resources, told selectmen that a moratorium would have a negative impact on the project. “To potential investors it could be devastating. … It could end up really damaging the prospects of the project inadvertently,” Pease said.

DEP Notice of Violation 
On July 15, 2022, the Maine Department of Environmental Protection (DEP) issued a notice of violation to Worcester Holdings LLC related to the construction of Flagpole of Freedom Cabins. According to the Flagpole of Freedom Cabins website, the cabins "are surrounded by the Worcester Balsam Farm's private land holdings to explore and are built with the intention of our guests viewing the progress of the future Flagpole of Freedom Park." In the letter to Worcester Holdings, the DEP said the company failed to comply with Maine’s Site Location of Development Act and Erosion and Sedimentation Control Law. The letter said: “On July 13, 2022, Department staff investigated a complaint concerning the construction of the Flagpole View Cabins off the Centerville Road in Columbia Falls. During the inspection staff found 54 cabins, an office building, a take-out restaurant, parking areas and access roads that were either under construction or had been completed. An area in excess of three acres had been stripped, graded, and not revegetated at the time of the inspection. Aerial imagery reveals that much of this area has been stripped and graded since at least 2019. There were no erosion and sediment controls in place at the time of the inspection. A search of the Department’s records found no evidence that the Department has issued a permit for this project. There is currently pending a Site Location application (#L-24835-28-B-N) for a similar project in another location on your parcel, but not for this location.”

Reactions 

Reactions have been mixed, with News Center Maine commenting "[i]t's a plan that has drawn praise, curiosity, and criticism." A common criticism was the amount of money raised could be used to directly aid veterans. In response, Rob Worcester commented that "instead of competing with those causes...we would align with those, choose some of those to support with our profits." Charles Kniffen, a combat-wounded veteran of the Vietnam War and the author of “Fifty Years in a Foxhole," penned an op-ed, calling the project "an affront," perceiving it "as an effort to cash in...far beyond any claim to respect," concluding "a giant flagpole marring the beauty of our land and beckoning with an unsightly frenzy of flags to persons from afar is no honor."

For his part, Andrew Carleen, a U.S. Navy-veteran, recalled the "Things Unnecessary" store in The Simpsons 'Tis the Fifteenth Season, calling "[t]he entire plan is a masterstroke of ostentatiousness." Carleen contrasted it to the Vietnam War Memorial, stating that "they do so while annihilating the sober minimalism that makes the original so striking," terming it, as well as the overuse of the flag, as "a child’s definition of patriotism." He further commented on the destination of the funds and veterans' "greater rates of suicide and substance abuse than the general population," and pleaded the project to "leave [his] name off of your nationalist vanity project."

See also 

 George Washington Museum of American History
 United States Semiquincentennial

References

External links 

 Official website
 Interview with Rob Worcester about Freedom Park on WQDY-FM
 Danny Martignetti on the Freedom Park on WGAN

Flags of the United States
Proposed monuments and memorials in the United States
Unbuilt buildings and structures in the United States
United States Semiquincentennial